The femoral head (femur head or head of the femur) is the highest part of the thigh bone (femur). It is supported by the femoral neck.

Structure
The head is globular and forms rather more than a hemisphere, is directed upward, medialward, and a little forward, the greater part of its convexity being above and in front.

The femoral head's surface is smooth. It is coated with cartilage in the fresh state, except over an ovoid depression, the fovea capitis, which is situated a little below and behind the center of the femoral head, and gives attachment to the ligament of head of femur.

The thickest region of the articular cartilage is at the centre of the femoral head, measuring up to 2.8 mm.

The diameter of the femoral head is usually larger in men than in women.

Fovea capitis
The fovea capitis is a small, concave depression within the head of the femur that serves as an attachment point for the ligamentum teres (Saladin). It is slightly ovoid in shape and is oriented "superior-to-posteroinferior. (Cerezal)" This orientation might be favorable for the tensed fibers of the ligamentum teres. The fovea capitis is located "slightly posterior and inferior to the center of the articular surface of the femoral head (Cerezal)" Unlike the head of the femur, the fovea capitis lacks any hyaline cartilage. The fovea capitis may contain vascular canals in two-thirds of individuals, but "their contribution to femoral head vascularity varies. (Cerezal)"

Clinical significance
If there is a fracture of the neck of the femur, the blood supply through the ligament becomes crucial. The head of the femur is relevant to orthopedic surgery because it can undergo avascular necrosis and consequent osteochondritis dissecans. The femoral head is removed in total hip replacement surgery.

Additional images

References

Cerezal, Luis. "Anatomy, Biomechanics, Imaging, and Management of Ligamentum Teres Injuries." RadioGraphica. RSNA, Oct. 2010. Web. Nov. 2015.
Saladin, Kenneth S.  Anatomy & Physiology: The Unity of Form and Function. 6th ed. New York, NY: McGraw-Hill, 2007. 300-302. Print.

External links
 

Bones of the lower limb
Femur